Péter Kovács (born 25 October 1989) is a Hungarian basketball player for Szolnoki Olaj of the Hungarian NB I/A and the Hungarian national team.

He participated at the EuroBasket 2017.

References

1989 births
Living people
Atomerőmű SE players
Falco KC Szombathely players
Hungarian men's basketball players
People from Baja, Hungary
PVSK Panthers players
Shooting guards
Szolnoki Olaj KK players
Sportspeople from Bács-Kiskun County